Joseph Schwantner: New Morning for the World; Nicolas Flagello: The Passion of Martin Luther King is a classical music album by the Oregon Symphony under the artistic direction of James DePreist, released by Koch International Classics in 1995. Recorded at the Arlene Schnitzer Concert Hall in Portland, Oregon, in September 1994, the album is a tribute to Martin Luther King Jr. and was released in his honor on the following holiday in his name.

The album features two works by American composers, each with text from speeches by King: Joseph Schwantner's New Morning for the World ("Daybreak of Freedom") and Nicolas Flagello's cantata The Passion of Martin Luther King. Both works include performances by Raymond Bazemore, who serves as narrator on the former and provides bass vocals on the latter. On the album's release date, more than 30 United States radio stations broadcast the album version of Schwantner's composition to commemorate the civil rights leader. Proceeds from the album's sale benefited the King Center for Nonviolent Social Change. Produced by Michael Fine and engineered by Fred Vogler, the recording reached a peak position of number three on Billboard Classical Albums chart and remains the Oregon Symphony's best-selling album as of 2013.

Composition
The album, 58 minutes and 54 seconds in length, contains two compositions: Joseph Schwantner's New Morning for the World ("Daybreak of Freedom") and Nicolas Flagello's cantata The Passion of Martin Luther King. Both compositions contain text from speeches by King delivered during the civil rights movement. The first track, 23 minutes and 27 seconds in length, features Schwantner's work. The Passion of Martin Luther King, 35 minutes and 17 seconds in length, is separated into nine tracks. The album was produced by Michael Fine and engineered by Fred Vogler. Coretta Scott King wrote the introduction for the album's liner notes.

New Morning for the World, composed in 1982 on commission from AT&T, premiered on January 15, 1983 (King's birthday) at the John F. Kennedy Center for the Performing Arts; David Effron conducted the Eastman Philharmonia, and Willie Stargell, then first baseman and team captain of the Pittsburgh Pirates, served as narrator. Schwantner selected words from public speeches by King that spanned more than a decade of his life. In the album's liner notes, program annotator and classical music radio host Jim Svejda described the work as having "equal parts" for the orchestra and the speaker, with King's words "supported and illuminated by an orchestra fabric of unusual variety and flexibility". Music critics compared Schwantner's composition to Aaron Copland's Lincoln Portrait because of its prominent narrative passages and its "broad and lyrical scoring that sounds unmistakably American". In describing the work, Melinda Bargreen of The Seattle Times wrote that percussion and "soaring" strings helped to emphasize King's orations. New Morning for the World contains text from the following speeches and writings by King: "Stride Toward Freedom" (1958), "Behind the Selma March" (1965), and "Letter from Birmingham Jail" (1963); the composition ends with King's "I Have a Dream" speech.

The Passion of Martin Luther King was composed in 1968 following King's assassination. The Passion was first recorded in London in 1969, with Ezio Flagello, the composer's brother, as the bass baritone soloist. This performance was eventually released by Naxos American Classics in 2012. DePreist conducted the National Symphony Orchestra's first performance of the work at the Kennedy Center on February 19, 1974. Music critics drew comparisons to Johann Sebastian Bach's Passions, which recounts Jesus' death. The Oregon Symphony album was the first published recording of the work. Bazemore provided bass vocals, with additional vocals by the Portland Symphonic Choir, directed by Bruce Browne. The nine sections of the work are performed with a brief pause in between.

Reception

The album was released by Koch International Classics on January 16, 1995, Martin Luther King Day.
On the same day, more than 30 United States radio stations broadcast the album's version of New Morning for the World to commemorate King. Martin Luther King III and Schwanter celebrated the album's release at Phipps Plaza in Atlanta. Proceeds from sales benefited the King Center for Nonviolent Social Change.

The album received positive commercial and critical reception. It reached a peak position of number three on Billboard Classical Albums chart and remains the Oregon Symphony's best-selling album as of 2013. In his review for Deseret News, music critic William S. Goodfellow wrote that each work contained "sophistication and substance". Goodfellow said of Schwanter's composition: "The more exotic scoring... as well as Schwantner's minimalistic treatment of the music's more militant episodes, gives it a drive and dramatic punch of its own." The album features Raymond Bazemore as narrator; Goodfellow described Bazemore's "occasionally sing-song narration" in New Morning for the World as "Lincolnesque". He wrote that Flagello's work contained "writing of remarkable clarity and Italianate warmth", but thought Bazemore's voice sounded hoarse towards the end and preferred the solo sections in New Morning for the World. The Seattle Times Melinda Bargreen called the album "strong and emotionally convincing", and praised "excellent performances with strong soloists". She wrote that both works were composed in "styles that are distinctively modern, but tonal and accessible". Bargreen described Bazemore's voice as "deeply affecting" and complimented DePreist for conducting "with an obvious passion for the music, drawing remarkably detailed and virtuosic performances from his orchestra." Tim Smith of the Sun-Sentinel said both works were "well worth hearing" and encouraged orchestras to explore the pieces, along with works by other African-American composers, to provide the public with broader programming. Smith described New Morning for the World as "remarkably lyrical" and "quite dramatic"; he found Bazemore's sing-song narration to be "too affected" but found the conclusion "touching" and complimented the orchestra for its overall "sturdy, communicative" performance. Smith called Flagello's score "unabashedly romantic" and described as effective the work of Bazemore, DePreist and the orchestra.

Track listing
 "New Morning for the World ("Daybreak of Freedom")" (Joseph Schwantner) – 23:27
 The Passion of Martin Luther King (Nicolas Flagello)
 "Hosanna filio David" – 3:27
 "At the Center of Nonviolence" – 4:04
 "Cor Jesu" – 3:53
 "In the Struggle" – 5:25
 "Et flagellis subditum" – 3:08
 "Death is inevitable" – 3:48
 "Stabat Mater" – 5:22
 "We've Got Some Difficult Days Ahead" – 2:13
 "Finale" – 3:48

Track listing adapted from Allmusic and the album's liner notes.

Personnel

 Peter Alward – production assistant
 Raymond Bazemore – bass, narrator (track 1)
 Bruce Browne – director of the Portland Symphony Choir (tracks 2–10)
 James DePreist – conductor, primary artist
 Michael Fine – producer
 Tamra Saylor Fine – assistant producer
 Michael Johnson – production assistant
 Martin Luther King Jr. – lyricist
 Susan Napodano – production manager
 Oregon Symphony – ensemble
 Portland Symphonic Choir – choir/chorus
 Jim Svejda – liner notes
 Fred Vogler – engineer

Credits adapted from Allmusic.

Orchestra roster

 Clarisse Atcherson – violin
 Kenneth Baldwin – bass (assistant principal)
 Aida Baker – violin
 Warren Baker – trombone (principal) (tracks 2–10)
 Lajos Balogh – violin (second, principal)
 David Bamonte – trumpet*
 Joseph Berger – horn (associate principal)
 Bill Berman – viola*
 Ronald Blessinger – violin
 Naomi Blumberg – cello
 David Bryan – trombone (principal)* (track 1)
 Sigrid Clark – violin
 Julie Coleman – violin (second)
 John Cox – horn (principal)
 Jennifer Craig – harp (principal)
 Dolores D'Aigle – violin (second, assistant principal)
 Juan de Gomar – bassoon (track 1)
 Eileen Deiss – violin
 Niel DePonte – percussion (principal)
 Frank Diliberto – bass (principal)
 Jonathan Dubay – violin
 Greta Eder – violin
 Cheri Ann Egbers – clarinet, librarian
 Jack Elmore – trombone
 Mark Eubanks – bassoon (principal)
 Hugh Ewert – associate concertmaster, violin
 Matthew Faust – violin (second)
 Kenneth Finch – cello
 Lynne Eisert Finch – violin (second)**
 Marian Fox – viola
 Michael Foxman – concertmaster, violin
 Leah Frajola – violin (second)
 Peter Frajola – assistant concertmaster, violin
 Javier Gandara – horn (assistant principal)
 Katherine George – keyboard (principal) (track 1)
 Mary Grant – horn
 Kathryn Gray – violin
 Martha Herby – flute
 Gyrid Hyde-Towle – violin (second)
 Ginger Iles – violin (second)
 India Jobelmann – cello (principal)
 Jeffrey Johnson – bass
 Eugene Kaza – violin (second)*
 Mary Ann Coggins Kaza – orchestra personnel manager, violin
 Frederick Korman – oboe (principal)
 Sally Nelson Kuhns – trumpet (assistant principal)
 Todd Kuhns – clarinet, E-flat clarinet/bass clarinet (track 1)
 Eileen Lande – violin (second)
 Harold Lawrence – cello
 Steve Lawrence – percussion
 Anne Leeder-Beesley – violin (second)
 Tristan Lehnert – violin
 Judith Litt – oboe
 Jerome Magill – bass
 Marlene Majovski – violin
 Richard Mansfield – bass
 Michelle Mathewson – viola* (track 1)
 Phillip Murthe – bass
 Audrey May – viola
 Stephanie McDougal – cello
 Patricia Miller – viola (assistant principal)*
 Robert Naglee – bassoon
 Yoshinori Nakao – clarinet (principal)
 Catherine Noll – violin (second)
 William Ofstad – bass
 Gayle Budd O'Grady – cello
 Harris Orem – English horn (track 1)
 Barton Parker – horn
 Christine Perry – percussion
 Jeff Peyton – percussion* (track 1)
 Alan Pierce – bass trombone
 Deloris Plum – cello
 Stephen Price – viola
 John Richards – librarian, tuba (principal)
 Georgeanne Ries – flute* (track 1), piccolo* (track 1)
 Paul Salvatore – timpani (principal)
 Fred Sautter – trumpet (principal)
 Anna Schaum – viola
 Timothy Scott – cello
 Michael Sigell – violin (second)
 Deborah Singer – violin
 Bridget Socolofsky – cello
 David Socolofsky – cello (assistant principal)
 Tomáš Svoboda – keyboard*, organ (tracks 2–10), piano (track 1)
 Peggy Swafford – viola
 Tommy Thompson – bass
 Randall Vemer – viola (principal)**
 Martha Warrington – viola (principal)*
 Dawn Weiss – flute (principal)
 Connie Whelan – viola
 Leo Whitlow – viola*
 Ron Williams – violin
 Carla Wilson – flute (track 1), piccolo

Orchestra roster adapted from the album's liner notes.

"*" designates acting orchestra members; "**" designates musicians on a leave of absence.

See also
 Civil rights movement in popular culture

References

External links
 "A Musical Journey in the Life of Martin Luther King, Jr.", WQXR-FM: playlist includes The Passion of Martin Luther King
 Joseph Schwantner – Full Biography

1995 classical albums
Albums recorded at the Arlene Schnitzer Concert Hall
Cultural depictions of Martin Luther King Jr.
Memorials to Martin Luther King Jr.
Oregon Symphony albums
Songs about Martin Luther King Jr.
Tribute albums to non-musicians